Tiphaine is a Francophone given name. Notable people with the name include:
 Tiphaine Raguenel (born 1335), Breton noblewoman and astrologer
 Tiphaine Duquesne (born 1996), field hockey player from Belgium

See also 

 Tiphaine (surname)

 Tiffany (disambiguation)
 Typhaine case, a 2009 infanticide in France